The Illhorn is a mountain of the Swiss Pennine Alps, overlooking Chandolin in the canton of Valais. With a height of 2,717 metres above sea level, it is the highest point of the Illgraben valley.

Illgraben debris flows

The Illgraben catchment extends from the summit of the Illhorn to the Rhone at an elevation of 610m, and experiences debris flows and mud slides several times annually. The largest recorded debris flow in the valley occurred in June 1961, and had a volume of several hundred thousand cubic metres. A warning system gives alert signals 5–15 minutes before the arrival of debris flows at channel crossings. The area is a popular hiking spot and these geomorphological processes are visible most years.

References

External links
 Illhorn on Hikr

Mountains of the Alps
Mountains of Switzerland
Mountains of Valais
Two-thousanders of Switzerland